The Price of Admission: How America's Ruling Class Buys Its Way into Elite Colleges - and Who Gets Left Outside the Gates is a 2005 book by Daniel Golden, a recipient of the Pulitzer Prize in journalism. The book criticizes admissions at elite American universities, including preferences given to the wealthy, children of celebrities, and legacy applicants. It also documents discrimination against Asian-Americans in the admissions process.

In 2017, the book was referenced by John Oliver, in the late-night talk show Last Week Tonight, regarding the way Jared Kushner got admitted to Harvard University, soon after the private Ivy League research university received a donation from Kushner's father. At the end of 2016, Golden expressed "gratitude to Jared Kushner", for "reviving interest the book".

Then Massachusetts Institute of Technology Dean of Admissions Marilee Jones is quoted in The Price of Admission as describing a Korean-American student as "yet another textureless math grind." Two years after the book's publication, Jones was found out to have fabricated several degrees in order to get her first job at the MIT Admission Office.

See also
 Spy Schools - Another book by Golden

References

External links
 The Price of Admission at www.randomhouse.com
 Book Discussion on The Price of Admission, November 13, 2006

Price of Admission
Price of Admission
Price of Admission
2005 non-fiction books